Italy–Malaysia relations refers to a foreign relations between the two countries, Italy and Malaysia. Italy has an embassy in Kuala Lumpur, and Malaysia has an embassy in Rome.

Economic relations 
Italy is Malaysia's fifth largest trading partner in the European Union. Currently Italy is interested in investing in Malaysia and since March 2009 around 871.9 million MYR has been invested to the country. A number of documents also signed by both sides to forge closer ties between them. In the first four months of 2009, total trade between the two countries amounted to 2.033 billion MYR, with Malaysian exports to Italy totalling 875.3 million MYR and imports from Italy amounting to 1.158 billion MYR. Some major Malaysian companies operating in Italy include the national oil and gas corporation, Petronas.

See also
 Foreign relations of Italy
 Foreign relations of Malaysia 
 Malaysia–EU relations

References

Further reading 
 Vicenza looks to Malaysia: a collaboration agreement made between Confindustria Vicenza and the Italian Malaysian Business Association. The agreement, which aims to strengthen the bilateral relations between Italy and Malaysia, was signed by Roberto Zuccato, President of Vicenza's manufacturers, and by Massimo Giannelli, President of IMBA. Confindustria Vicenza

 
Malaysia
Bilateral relations of Malaysia